Orbifloxacin (brand name Orbax) is a fluoroquinolone antibiotic which is approved for use in dogs, marketed by Schering-Plough Animal Health.

See also

 Quinolone

References

Fluoroquinolone antibiotics
Cyclopropanes
Dog medications
1,4-di-hydro-7-(1-piperazinyl)-4-oxo-3-quinolinecarboxylic acids